Ottomar Georg Alexander Geschke (16 November 1882 – 17 May 1957)  was a German politician, trade unionist and anti-Nazi activist.

Biography 
Geschke was born into a blacksmith's family. After receiving an elementary education he trained as a locksmith and worked in Berlin. From 1908 he participated in the labor movement by joining the German Metal Workers' Union. In 1910, Geschke joined the SPD and in 1917, due to disagreement on the issue of providing military loans, he moved to the USPD. During the November Revolution of 1918 he was elected a member of the Berlin Soviet of Workers' and Soldiers' Deputies.

Geschke was a member of the Spartacus League and joined the Communist Party (KPD) in 1919, and in 1920 worked in the party's trade union department. In 1923 he was elected to the board of the KKD as a representative of the left wing. From 1925 he was a member of the Central Committee and the Politburo of the party. He was a member of the Executive Bureau of the Red International of Trade Unions and from 1924 was a member of the Executive Committee of the Comintern. From 1921 to 1924 Geschke was elected to the Prussian Landtag. In the elections of 1924 he was elected to the Reichstag and retained his mandate until July 1932.

For his anti-fascist activities, Geschke was repeatedly arrested and imprisoned in prisons and concentration camps. After the Nazis came to power in 1933, Geschke was arrested and held in the Lichtenburg, Sonnenburg and Buchenwald concentration camps. In 1940 he was released from prison and lived in Köslin under police surveillance.

After the assassination attempt on Hitler on July 20, 1944, Geschke was again arrested and placed in the Sachsenhausen concentration camp. In May 1945 he was liberated by the allied forces.

After the Second World War, Geschke continued to be involved in politics and from May 19, 1945, to January 8, 1947, he worked in the magistrate of Greater Berlin, headed by Arthur Werner as a social adviser. In April 1946, Geschke joined the Socialist Unity Party (SED) and from 1946 to 1953 was on the board of the party's branch in Berlin. From 1947 to 1953 he was chairman of the Union of Persecutees of the Nazi Regime and was elected from this organization to the Volkskammer of the GDR. In 1953 he was elected to the presidium of the Committee of Anti-Fascist Resistance Fighters.

He was buried in the Memorial of the Socialists at the Friedrichsfelde Central Cemetery in Berlin.

References 

1882 births
1957 deaths
People from Fürstenwalde
People from the Province of Brandenburg
Social Democratic Party of Germany politicians
Independent Social Democratic Party politicians
Communist Party of Germany politicians
Socialist Unity Party of Germany politicians
Union of Persecutees of the Nazi Regime members
Members of the Reichstag of the Weimar Republic
Members of the Provisional Volkskammer
Members of the 1st Volkskammer
Members of the 2nd Volkskammer
Members of the Landtag of Prussia
German trade unionists
German Comintern people
Executive Committee of the Communist International
German anti-fascists
Communists in the German Resistance
Buchenwald concentration camp survivors
Sachsenhausen concentration camp survivors
Sachsenhausen concentration camp prisoners